Michael Coady may refer to:

 Michael Coady (poet) (born 1939), Irish poet and short story writer 
 Michael Coady (rugby) (born 1987), English rugby footballer

See also
 Mick Coady (born 1958), English footballer (full name Michael Liam Coady)